Zell am See Airport is a public use airport located  south of Zell am See, Salzburg, Austria. Usable for airplanes up to 5.7 tonnes.

See also
List of airports in Austria

References

External links 
 Official Website of Zell am See Airport.
 Airport record for Zell am See Airport at Landings.com
 

Airports in Austria
Transport in Salzburg (state)
Zell am See
Buildings and structures in Salzburg (state)